Soe Zeya Tun  is a Pulitzer Prize-winning photojournalist at Reuters.

On 17 April 2021, in the aftermath of the 2021 Myanmar coup d'état, he was charged and issued arrest warrants under section 505 (A) of the Myanmar Penal Code by the State Administration Council for speaking out against the military coup. Along with several other celebrities, he was charged with calling for participation in the Civil Disobedience Movement (CDM) and damaging the state's ability to govern, with supporting the Committee Representing Pyidaungsu Hluttaw, and with generally inciting the people to disturb the peace and stability of the nation.

References

Burmese journalists
Living people
Year of birth missing (living people)